Westhoughton railway station is one of the two stations which serve the town of Westhoughton, in the Metropolitan Borough of Bolton, Greater Manchester, north-western England.

History 
It is the only station on a line connecting the Manchester-Preston Line at Bolton and the Manchester-Southport Line at Hindley near Wigan. It was opened in 1848, along with the line, by the Liverpool and Bury Railway, when the route between the two via Wigan and Bolton was completed. It subsequently became part of the Lancashire and Yorkshire Railway.

The station is in Church Street, about ten minutes walk from the town centre. Westhoughton is also served by Daisy Hill railway station, around 15 minutes on foot from the town centre, on the Manchester-Southport Line, via Atherton.

Unlike the town's other station at Daisy Hill, Westhoughton station has been unstaffed since 1974, when all the trackside and roadside buildings were demolished. This is despite the fact that Westhoughton enjoyed similar levels of patronage. From 2004 to 2012, passenger usage increased by 231%. The station's passenger usage seems set to grow further, as there has been considerable housing development on brownfield land, which was the site of a mine, within a few hundred yards of the station, as the town continues to grow as a commuter suburb.

In the late 1980s, Westhoughton very nearly had a new third station at Dobb Brow, and planning went as far as allowing the proposed station to appear on railway maps as "may open during the course of this timetable". At the last moment, however, plans were shelved. In 2000, these plans were revived, but did not come to fruition.

In 2008, unspecified development was planned for the station as part of GMPTE's plans to impose a congestion charge on drivers entering Manchester city centre at peak times, and use the funds raised to upgrade public transport provision. The scheme was dropped after the proposal was substantially rejected in a referendum.

Location and facilities 
There are neither toilets nor refreshment facilities, nor a payphone since 2011. A card-only ticket machine and "remote travel information" are provided by 
screens on each platform.

Until 2013, The Commercial pub stood next door to the station, when it was closed and put up for sale.

There are bus stops for services to many parts of the town, and to the town's other station, Daisy Hill.

Access to the Bolton platform is by a long steep multi-stepped ramp and to the Wigan platform via a steep unstepped ramp. Access to both platforms has not been improved for those with prams, pushchairs or wheelchairs.

There is a large free car park with unsignposted access to the station.

The station is partly maintained by the Friends of Westhoughton Station, a voluntary group set up in 2012 with the aim of brightening up the station and providing floral displays.

Services 

For many years Westhoughton had an hourly service. Since the 1980s services have dramatically improved:

Since the May 2018 timetable change, the service pattern has been altered significantly. In the evening, the service drops to hourly. From the December 2019 timetable change however, the timetable is being revamped once again - though the service frequency remains unchanged, trains will now run through to Southport via Wallgate once again westbound and alternately to Stalybridge via Victoria and Alderley Edge via Piccadilly on weekdays and Saturdays. On Sundays, there'll be an hourly service to Manchester Victoria and Wigan N.W.

On weekends, trains were replaced by buses until the end of 2018 due to ongoing electrification work on the Preston - Bolton - Salford Crescent route (which ran significantly behind schedule).

Regular through services to Liverpool via Wallgate and  once operated via Bolton/Westhoughton, which originally formed part of the Liverpool and Bury Railway and also the L&Y main line between Liverpool Exchange and Manchester, prior to the opening of the direct route through Swinton. However, since the western end of the route was electrified in 1978, Kirkby trains have either terminated at Wigan or been re-routed via Atherton.

Trains continuing to Bolton pass by, but cannot stop at,  (Junction) station, as there are no platforms for the Wigan line. Passengers wishing to travel from Westhoughton to Preston and Blackpool must either change at Wigan Wallgate, usually crossing the road to Wigan North Western, a 100 yards walk, or via Bolton. Connections to London Euston can be made at Wigan, which is recommended as there is always only one change, or at Manchester Piccadilly.

Between May and December 2015, the service pattern was altered temporarily due to the work being carried out to widen Farnworth Tunnel as part of the plans to electrify the Manchester to Preston Line.  With only limited capacity south of Bolton, Manchester services were reduced to an hourly frequency, and curtailed at Bolton on Monday to Fridays, whilst weekend services were replaced by buses as Bolton station was also undergoing upgrade work for electrification. A peak hour bus shuttle to and from Daisy Hill was introduced to connect with those trains that had been diverted via Walkden, whilst westbound trains ran to Kirkby once again rather than Southport.  This timetable ended in December 2015, when the line through Farnworth Tunnel was reopened.

Upgrade and electrification 
An upgrade and electrification to the railway line through the station was first announced in December 2013. It was officially announced as definitely going ahead on 1 September 2021. As of January 2022 electrification and associated work is in progress. This includes bridge renewals and modifications as well as platform lengthening and station modification. The Bolton to Wigan electrification including Westhoughton station upgrade is scheduled for completion in 2024.

References

External links 

	

Railway stations in the Metropolitan Borough of Bolton
DfT Category F1 stations
Former Lancashire and Yorkshire Railway stations
Northern franchise railway stations
Railway stations in Great Britain opened in 1848
Westhoughton